Chipinge South is a constituency of the National Assembly of the Parliament of Zimbabwe, located in Manicaland Province. Its current MP since the 2018 election is Enock Porusingazi of ZANU–PF.

References 

Manicaland Province
Parliamentary constituencies in Zimbabwe